BlephEx is a medical device used in the fields of ophthalmology and optometry to treat blepharitis and dry eye disease. The handheld device is used by a doctor to exfoliate the eyelid at the lash line and remove the inflammatory biofilm that leads to chronic lid disease and discomfort.

History 
BlephEx was invented in 2012 by James Rynerson, MD, a board-certified ophthalmologist, as the first patented, in-office procedure that allows eye care professionals to take an active role in removing years of accumulated biofilm, scurf and debris from the eyelids. Since the lid margin is the only place on the body that never gets washed, the bacterial biofilm tends to accumulate over the years, getting worse as we age. Contact lens wearers are also prone to developing biofilms of the lid margin at a much earlier age due to the foreign body nature of the contact lens.

BlephEx purportedly removes years of accumulated biofilm, eliminating the source of inflammation which leads to healthier, more comfortable eyelids and an increase in natural tear production. Many patients are able to stop using artificial tears altogether. Two independent studies demonstrate a 60%-66% increase in tear break up time, which is an indicator of improved tear function.

Procedure 

To administer the device, a physician glides the BlephEx hand piece along the lash line, applying the spinning surgical-grade micro sponge to the lid margin. The sponge is soaked in a lid scrub solution and removes inflammatory scurf, biofilm and bacterial exotoxins (the main causes of inflammatory lid disease), thereby relieving blepharitis symptoms and improving overall eyelid health. The treatment takes 8–10 minutes to perform, is well tolerated and it is reported that many patients experience nearly immediate relief.

By repeating the procedure every 4 – 6 months (like a dental cleaning), a patient can keep the lid margins totally clean and inflammation free. This healthy lid environment helps patients make their own tears, avoiding dry eye syndrome.

Cost to Patient and Society

The costs of dry eye disease are significant, with some patients spending an average of $800 per year on dry products. The total direct and indirect cost to society has been estimated by the NIH at over $55 billion. This procedure has the potential of saving money while at the same time allowing doctors to take better care of their patients.

References

Ophthalmic equipment